Miramichi is a provincial electoral district for the Legislative Assembly of New Brunswick, Canada.  It was contested in the 2014 general election, having been created in the 2013 redistribution of electoral boundaries.

The district comprises mainly the portions of the former ridings of Miramichi Centre and Miramichi-Bay du Vin that fell within the Miramichi city limits, namely the former communities of Newcastle and Chatham. Other parts of the city of Miramichi such as Nordin and Douglastown fall in the Miramichi Bay-Neguac district.

Members of the Legislative Assembly

Election results

References

External links 
Website of the Legislative Assembly of New Brunswick
Map of Miramichi riding as of 2018

New Brunswick provincial electoral districts
Politics of Miramichi, New Brunswick